Vishnu TM (born 2000) is an Indian professional footballer from Kerala. He plays as a winger for Indian Super League club East Bengal. He has represented Aryan in Calcutta Football League in the 2021 season.

References 

2000 births
Living people
Indian footballers
Association football wingers
East Bengal Club players